Henry J. Hopper (1830–1905) was the 21st Mayor of Jersey City, New Jersey from May 6, 1878 to May 2, 1880.

Biography
Hopper was born in 1830 in New Jersey. He married Margaret Stagg Mount on April 3, 1855. They had three children; Sophronia, Arthur and Marian. He became a steel merchant with the Crucible Steel Company of New York City. A Democrat, he was elected mayor on April 9, 1878. After serving one term as mayor, the Democrats did not re-nominate him but instead went with Isaac William Taussig.

Hopper died in his home in East Orange, New Jersey on October 6, 1905.

References

1830 births
1905 deaths
New Jersey Democrats
Mayors of Jersey City, New Jersey
Politicians from East Orange, New Jersey